Old Compton Street is a road that runs east–west through Soho in the West End of London.

History

The street was named after Henry Compton who raised funds for a local parish church, eventually dedicated as St Anne's Church in 1686. The area in general and this street, in particular, became the home of Huguenots, French Protestant refugees who were given asylum in England by Charles II in 1681.

The street was known simply as Compton Street until being renamed to Old Compton Street in 1896. By the end of the eighteenth century and until that renaming, the east end of the street between Greek Street and Charing Cross Road (at the time, Crown Street) was known as Little Compton Street. A street sign for Little Compton Street remains on the wall of a utility tunnel that runs beneath Charing Cross Road, and is visible through a street grate on a traffic island.

By the end of the 18th century, fewer than ten of the houses were without shop fronts. An 1818 trade directory shows that the businesses occupying premises in the street included several watch and clock makers, a bookseller, a straw hat maker, a surgeon and accoucheur, an undertaker, a mathematical instrument maker, a bedding warehouse, several grocers and two "dealers in curiosities".

 
In the middle of the 19th century, while there were some workshops too, as well as restaurants and public houses, the ground floors of most of the houses were still used as shops. The number of people of overseas descent continued to grow and the street became a meeting place for exiles, particularly those from France: after the suppression of the Paris Commune, the poets Arthur Rimbaud and Paul Verlaine often frequented drinking haunts here. Richard Wagner also spent time living on the street: more generally it became a home for artists, philosophers, bohemians and composers.
In 1887, M. Siari, an Algerian, established the Algerian Coffee Stores at number 52, still known as among the world's best leading suppliers of tea and coffee, and remains up to now one of the oldest shops in the street.

The street's radical and artistic traditions continued after World War II, with it being frequented by communists, proto-beatniks and existentialists, and it became a centre for modern and trad jazz.

Between 1956 and 1970 the 2i's Coffee Bar was located at number 59. Many well-known 1960s pop musicians played in its cramped surroundings.

Current

Since the 1970s, the street has become a focal point for London's lesbian, gay, bisexual and transgender community. It features several gay bars, gay-friendly restaurants,  cafés and specialist gay shops. Whilst a pedestrianisation project proved unpopular with local traders and was reversed, the street is closed to vehicular traffic for the Soho Pride festival one weekend each year, usually in late summer.
The Prince Edward Theatre is located at the eastern end of the street. Until 2004 the long-running production of Mamma Mia!, a musical based upon the songs of ABBA, was showing at the theatre. When Mamma Mia! moved to larger premises in another part of the West End, a production of Mary Poppins moved in, but closed in 2008. It subsequently became home to Aladdin and currently a 2019 revival of Mary Poppins. London producer and director Adam Spreadbury-Maher lives at the northern end of Old Compton Street.

In 1999, the Admiral Duncan pub, a well-known gay venue, was the site of a terrorist nail bomb attack which killed three people and injured over a dozen. A neo-nazi, David Copeland, was subsequently found guilty of the bombing (intended specifically to injure members of the gay community). Previously decorated in neutral colours, Admiral Duncan was re-opened following the attack with a flamboyant pink and purple exterior with a large rainbow flag flying outside as a symbol of gay pride.

Along the street are various other gay bars including Comptons of SOHO and G-A-Y. Also on the street are a variety of cafés, tea rooms (including the original cafe that gave its name to the Patisserie Valerie chain) and restaurants (including Bincho, a yakitori restaurant and Balans, (which, unusually for the UK, is open 24 hours a day), and specialist sex shops.

Additional adjoining streets
 Wardour Street
 Greek Street
 New Compton Street

References

External links

 Panoramic view at the junction with Dean Street
 Discovering Old Compton Street and New Compton Street
 Compton Street, Old and New
 CloneZone, London's oldest Gay sex shop

Gay villages in England
Streets in the City of Westminster
Shopping streets in London
LGBT culture in London
Streets in Soho